is a professional Magic: The Gathering player from Japan. He is one of only eight players to have reached the top eight of a Pro Tour more than five times.

Career
Tsumura debuted at the 2003 Pro Tour in Chicago. Over the next two seasons, he qualified for most Pro Tours, but never earned more than the minimum two pro points. The 2005 season saw Tsumura make his breakthrough. A twenty-first-place finish at the first Pro Tour of the season in Columbus was a sign of things to come. At Pro Tour Atlanta, he made the final day of a Pro Tour for the first time. Alongside teammates Tomoharu Saitou and Tomohiro Kaji, Tsumura was eliminated in the semifinals by the eventual winners, Nova (consisting of David Rood, Gabe Tsang, and Gabriel Nassif). At the next Pro Tour, held in Philadelphia, Tsumura proved that Atlanta was no fluke. He made the top eight a second time, this time making it all the way to the finals before losing to Gadiel Szleifer. At Pro Tour Los Angeles, Tsumura made the top eight for a third time in one season, once again losing to the eventual winner, Antoine Ruel, this time in the semifinals. In addition to his three Pro Tour top eights, Tsumura also reached the top eight of four Grand Prix events. At the end of the season, he earned the Player of the Year award, besting Olivier Ruel 84 points to 83. He did so without ever having made day two of a Limited format Pro Tour, so he made it his goal to improve in this format the following season. He succeeded with this goal, winning back to back Grand Prix events at Kuala Lumpur and Toulouse, both of which were Limited. In addition, Tsumura also made the top eight of Pro Tour Kobe, losing to Bastien Perez in the quarterfinals. The 2007 season saw Tsumura make the top eight of a Pro Tour for the fifth time in Geneva. After the 2007 season, Tsumura announced that he would take a break from traveling to Magic tournaments in order to complete his studies. Nevertheless, he managed a top eight appearance at a Grand Prix on home turf and another top eight appearance at the 2008 World Championship in Memphis. In 2012, Tsumura was inducted into the Magic: The Gathering Hall of Fame at Pro Tour Return to Ravnica. Later that year he made another top eight appearance at Grand Prix Nagoya.

Accomplishments

Top 8 appearances 

Other accomplishments
 Pro Tour Player of the Year 2005

References

Living people
Japanese Magic: The Gathering players
1986 births
Sportspeople from Hiroshima